Known for a long time as the President’s medal, the Honour medal of Foreign Affairs is a state decoration bestowed by the French Republic in the form of an honour medal for work.  It was originally created by a Royal decree of 28 July 1816 as a single grade medal to reward acts of courage displayed by French nationals on foreign soil.    An 1861 Imperial decree saw it be split into the silver and gold grades.      The year 1887 saw the addition of swords to the medal for award to both French or allied military personnel for acts of courage in favour of the French in time of war.  Although still bestowed in wartime for courage, the modern award is now aimed at rewarding civil servants of the ministry for Foreign Affairs.

Award statute  
Currently, the Honour medal of Foreign Affairs is intended to reward honorable service by French diplomats and civil servants stationed outside of France.  It can also be awarded to French nationals and foreigners for exceptional service to France or that have accomplished acts of courage in assistance to French nationals either in peace or wartime.  Military awards are often bestowed on order of the French president, hence the common practice of calling it the President’s medal.  President Raymond Poincaré bestowed many such medals to French and foreign nationals during World War I.

The Honour medal of Foreign Affairs is currently divided into three grades, bronze, silver and gold.  When awarded for service, the bronze grade is awarded for no less than 20 years of service, the silver grade may be awarded a minimum of eight years later, the gold grade, seven years after the silver.
           
The Honour medal of Foreign Affairs may be exceptionally awarded regardless of seniority and set quotas to reward bravery and dedication.  It can be awarded, also regardless of seniority and set quotas, if the recipient was wounded or killed in the line of duty.
  
The wartime award with swords is bestowed as follows:
In bronze to privates;
In silver to non-commissioned officers;
In gold (silver-gilt prior to 2010) to officers.

Award description
The Honour medal of Foreign Affairs, a design of engraver Daniel Dupuis, is a 27mm in diameter circular medal in bronze, silver or gold.  The obverse bears the relief effigy of the republic surrounded by the relief inscription "RÉPUBLIQUE FRANÇAISE" along the left and right circumference.  The reverse bears a crown of half laurel and half oak leaves with the relief inscription "AFFAIRES ÉTRANGÈRES" with a bare center destined to receive the recipient’s name and year of award.

The medal hangs from a silk moiré tricolour ribbon composed of three equal blue-white-red vertical stripes.  The wartime award includes a wreath of oak leaves with two crossed swords on the suspension ring.

Partial recipients' list for acts of courage and devotion

Gold grade:
Mr Mohamed Salem ABDOU
Mrs Isabelle DUMONT
Mr. Alain REMY
Mr Frédéric de TOUCHET

Silver grade:
Mr Walter ARNAUD
Mr Richard BEAUX
Mr Philippe BERJONNEAU
Mr Francky BLANDEAU
Mrs Isabelle du BOIS de MEYRIGNAC
Mr Vincent CORBEAU
Mr Vincent FALCOZ
Mr Jean-Marc FIORENTINI
Mrs Julie FORT
Mr François GARCIA
Mrs Mathilde de GERMAIN
Mr Cédric GRAS
Mrs Sophie LAFITTE
Mr Jérôme MALLARD
Mr Guillaume NARJOLLET
Mrs Agnès NKAKE
Mr Pascal NOJAC
Mrs Sylvie NOJAC
Mr Gérard NOUBEL
Mr Cédric PELTIER
Mr Eric TOSATTI

Bronze grade:
Mr Serge BESANGER  
Mr Thierry BINOIST
Mrs Marie-Amélie DELAROCHE
Mrs Annick DORIS
Mrs Françoise DUBREUIL-KRIKORIAN
Mr Emmanuel FABRY
Mr Daniel FARBAT
Mr Jorge FERNANDEZ
Mr Pascal GEHANT
Mr Thierry MAIRE
Mrs Claire MALANDAIN
Mr Yann MILLET
Mr Frédéric PECH
Mr Marc RASTOLL
Mrs Corinne SIDIBE
Mrs Martine THEMIN
Mr Jean-Christophe THIABAUD

Partial recipients' list for service to civil servants

Gold grade:
Mr Arnaud BALNER
Mrs Mathilde de CALAN
Mrs Christine FAGES
Mrs Leslie GOLDLUST
Mrs Catherine HYVER
Mr Bertrand LE ROUX
Mr Alain RICHEZ
Mr Christophe SCHMITT
Mr Mounir SLIMANI
Mr Clément TARON-BROCARD
Mr Guillaume VELUT

Silver grade:
Mr Nicolas BARNAUD
Mr Rémi COTTIN
Mrs Pauline DELAPORTE
Mr Rémi DROUIN
Mr Julien MARIANI
Mr Jean-Baptiste POHL
Mr Odoric PORCHER
Mrs Candice VERLOT

Bronze grade:
Mrs Marie Noelle LANDAZURI
Mr Smaïl CHAOUI
Mr Dimitri DEMIANENKO
Mr Guillaume GRELAUD
Mr Fabrice GROSSIR
Mr Rodolphe MONNET
Mr Guillaume PEGHAIRE
Mr Mickaël PITHON
Mr Arnaud ROLLAND
Mr Gwenn VALLEE
Mr Philippe VUYLSTEKE

Partial recipients' list to foreign military personnel

In October 1917, the design of the crossed swords on two sprays of oak leaves changed.  The medal ranked after the Croix de Guerre and several were awarded to service members of Allied forces, including personnel from:
 (partial list)

Driver George Lang Gordon Royal Field Artillery Bronze grade with swords date awarded unknown
 Lance Corporal (Acting Sergeant) John Henry Cory (mounted Military Police). Bronze grade with swords awarded 14 July 1919. 
 Sergeant-Observer William James Middleton, Royal Air Force. Silver grade with swords awarded 22 August 1919.
 Private Albert Weickers. Bronze grade with swords awarded 22 August 1919.
 Air Mechanic 1st Class Clarence Harold Cobden, Royal Air Force. Bronze grade with swords awarded 22 August 1919.
 Cpl Herbert Reginald Verrall GS/2779, Queen's Own (Royal West Kent) Regiment (8th Bn). Bronze grade with swords awarded 21 November 1918
 (partial list)
Vice Admiral Joel T. Boone, USN.  Gold grade.
Arley Munson Hare 
 (7 Gold, 26 Silver, 16 Bronze)
 A. A. Shambler, bronze with swords
 Corporal (Later Brigadier) Lionel H. Lemaire, Silver-Gilt grade with swords for actions in the Battle of the Somme
 (2 Gold, 4 Silver, 6 Bronze)
 Newfoundland
Sgt Ernest Gullicksen, Royal Newfoundland Regiment, Bronze with swords for actions during the German Spring Offensive of 1918.
 (partial list)
Lieutenant Joseph-Hector-Ernest Allen, 22nd battalion CEF, Silver-gilt grade with swords awarded 15 April 1915
Lieutenant-colonel Hugues-Lemoyne De Martigny, 22nd battalion CEF, Silver-gilt grade with swords awarded 27 October 1914
Private Alphonse Marcotte, 22nd battalion CEF, Silver grade with swords awarded 15 June 1915
Private Raoul Ouimet, 22nd battalion CEF, Silver grade with swords awarded 2 July 1915
Private Georges Marcoux, 22nd battalion CEF, Bronze grade with swords awarded 13 January 1917
 (partial list)
Risaldar-major Thakur Mul Singh, 26th King George’s Own Light Cavalry, Silver-gilt grade with swords
Subedar-major Chandrapal Singh, 7th (Duke of Connaught's Own) Rajputs, Silver-gilt grade with swords
Acting Lance naik Mohamed Shaffi Khan, 32nd Lancers, Bronze grade with swords
Sepoy Fazal Hussain, 46th Punjabis, Bronze grade with swords
Havildar Appaya Kumbi, 101st Grenadiers, Bronze grade with swords

See also

 Ministry of Foreign Affairs and International Development (France)

References

External links

Civil awards and decorations of France
Military awards and decorations of France
Courage awards
Awards established in 1816
1816 establishments in France
Long service medals
Diplomatic awards and decorations